Ministry of Water and Environment (Arabic: وزارة المياه والبيئة ) is a cabinet ministry of Yemen.

List of ministers
 Tawfiq al-Sharjabi (17 December 2020 – present)
 Azi Shuraim (2014)

See also
 Politics of Yemen

References

Government ministries of Yemen